Hyphessobrycon bifasciatus, or Yellow tetra, is a species of fish in the family characidae.

Etymology and description
Hyphessobrycon translates from Greek to “small” or “lesser bite”. Bifasciatus translates from Latin to “two bars” or “bands”. The yellow tetra is a small, silver fish. It is similar to the black phantom tetra. One difference includes its yellow and red fins.

Distribution
The yellow tetra is found around southeastern Brazil and Paraná River basin in coastal rivers.

References

http://www.seriouslyfish.com/species/hyphessobrycon-bifasciatus/
http://www.fishbase.org/summary/12379

Fish described in 1911
Taxa named by Marion Durbin Ellis
Characidae